Acrobasis nigribasalis is a species of snout moth in the genus Acrobasis. It is found in Iran.

References

Moths described in 1954
Acrobasis
Moths of Asia